Monjarás is a corregimiento in Calobre District, Veraguas Province, Panama with a population of 585 as of 2010. Its population as of 1990 was 580; its population as of 2000 was 569.

References

Corregimientos of Veraguas Province